James Eugene Snyder (born October 17, 1965) is an American journalist. He is a former member of the Democratic Party.

Awards and nominations
 2009, won Pacific Southwest Regional Emmy Award for KVBC (now KSNV)
 2014, nominated Pacific Southwest Regional Emmy Award for KSNV-DT (now KSNV)

References

External links
 

1965 births
Living people
American male journalists
American people of Dutch descent
American people of Norwegian descent
American television reporters and correspondents
Journalists from Illinois
Journalists from Las Vegas
Journalists from Washington (state)
Nevada Democrats
Nevada Independents
Television anchors from Las Vegas
Washington State University alumni